Aberdour School, founded in 1928, is a co-educational preparatory school for ages 2–11 in Burgh Heath (near Banstead), Surrey, England.

History
Aberdour was founded in 1928 by R.M.D Grange as a boys' boarding school. In 1971 Aberdour School became an educational charitable trust and is now administered by a board of governors. In 1994 it became a co-educational school and its first intake of girls was welcomed with the newly opened nursery.

Awards 
2010, Royal Society of Chemistry's Bill Bryson Science Prize.

2010, TES Independent School Awards, Head of the Year - Winner

2013, TES Independent School Awards, Outstanding Financial/Commercial Initiative - Winner

Headmasters
 R.M.D. Grange (1933–1981)
 Alan Barraclough (1981–2002)
 Dr Gerard Silverlock (2002–2006)
 Simon Collins (2006–present)

Notable pupils

Simon Thomas, television presenter
Jeremy Vine, television journalist and presenter
Tim Vine, comedian

References

External links
 Aberdour School Website
 Aberdour School ISN Report
 Oblique aerial photograph of house and grounds in 1928; another such image

Educational institutions established in 1933
Preparatory schools in Surrey
Boys' schools in Surrey
Girls' schools in Surrey
Private schools in Surrey
Reigate and Banstead
 
1933 establishments in England